OshidaMount Khwaja or Mount Khwajeh is a flat-topped black basalt hill rising up as an island in the middle of Lake Hamun, in the Iranian province of Sistan and Baluchestan.

The trapezoid-shaped basalt lava outcropping, located 30 km southwest of the town of Zabol, rises to 609 meters above sea level and has a diameter ranging from 2.0 to 2.5 kilometres. It is the only natural height in the Sistan area, and is named after an Islamic pilgrimage site on the hill: the tomb and shrine of Khwaja Ali Mahdi, a descendant of Ali ibn Abi Talib.

Mount Khwaja is also considered an important archaeological site. On the southern promontory of the eastern slope, the ruins of a citadel complex - known as the Ghagha-Shahr - with its remains of a fire temple date to pre-Islamic Iran. According to Zoroastrian legend, Lake Hamun is "the keeper of Zoroaster's seed." In Zoroastrian eschatology, when the final renovation of the world is near, maidens will enter the lake and then give birth to the saoshyans, the saviours of humankind.

The fire temple is on a terrace behind high walls and is protected by two forts, whose remains are respectively known as Kok-e Zal and Chehel Dokhtaran. Collectively, the ruins are called Qal'a-e Kafaran "Fort of Infidels" or Qal'a-e Sam "Fort of Sam," the grandfather of the mythical Rostam (one of the fortresses here is named "Rostams castle"). Both names reflect pre-Islamic heritage. The walls of the temple were once extravagantly decorated with murals, some of which are now on display in museums in Tehran, Berlin, New Delhi and New York.

The citadel complex was first investigated by Marc Aurel Stein in 1915–1916. The site was later excavated by Ernst Herzfeld, and was again investigated in part by Giorgio Gullini in a short expedition of 1960. Initially, Herzfeld tentatively dated the palace complex to the 1st century CE, that is, to the Arsacid period (248 BCE-224 CE). Herzfeld later revised his estimate to a later date and today the Sassanid period (224-651 CE) is usually considered to be more likely. Three bas-reliefs on the outer walls that depict riders and horses are attributed to this later period. Beyond the citadel at the top of the plateau are several other unrelated buildings, of uncertain function and probably dating to the Islamic period.

Murals

Ruins

See also
 Sistan Basin
 Helmand River

References

Sources

External links 

 Ernst Herzfeld Papers, Series 5: Drawings and Maps, Records of Kuh-e Khwaja Collections Search Center, S.I.R.I.S., Smithsonian Institution, Washington, D.C.

Khwajeh, Mount
Archaeological sites in Iran
Architecture in Iran
Castles in Iran
Landforms of Sistan and Baluchestan Province
Sistan
Former populated places in Iran
Buildings and structures in Sistan and Baluchestan Province
Tourist attractions in Sistan and Baluchestan Province
National works of Iran
Sasanian castles
Mountains of Iran